(The) Guilty Party or Guilty Parties may also refer to:

 Guilty party, someone who is responsible for committing an offense in law.

Film and television
 The Guilty Party, a 1912 short film directed by Oscar Apfel
 The Guilty Party, a 1917 short film by Thomas R. Mills based on the O. Henry short story
 "The Guilty Party", episode 37 of the 1953 4th season of the TV series BBC Sunday-Night Theatre
 Guilty Party (1956 TV series), a BBC miniseries written by Edward J. Mason and Tony Shryane
 "The Guilty Party", episode 10 of the 1957 1st season of the TV series The O. Henry Playhouse, adapted from the O. Henry short story
 "The Guilty Party", episode 19 of the 1960 6th season of the TV series Dixon of Dock Green
 "The Guilty Party", an episode of the 1963 TV series The Scales of Justice
 "The Guilty Party", episode 27 of the 1964 9th season of the TV series ITV Play of the Week
 "Guilty Party", 18th episode of the 1987 second season of the TV series The Colbys
 "The Guilty Party", episode 6 of the 1990 4th season of the TV series Thirtysomething
 "The Guilty Party", episode 18 of the 1992 3rd season of the TV series Dream On
 "Guilty Party", the two-part 23rd and 24th episodes of the 1993 2nd season of the TV series A Country Practice
 "The Guilty Party", episode 12 of the 2003 2nd season of the TV series Cyberchase 
 "Guilty Party", 114th episode of 2009 11th season of the TV series Doctors
 "Guilty Parties", episode 6 of the 2011 2nd season of the TV series Sophomores
 Guilty Party (TV series), on Paramount+

Other uses
 Guilty Party (video game) 2010 
 The Guilty Party, a short story by O. Henry, first published in The Trimmed Lamp (1907)
 Guilty Party, 1997 EP by the band Out Hud
 The Guilty Party, Roger Glover's band from 2002